Pedra da Galé is an uninhabited islet in the Gulf of Guinea, part of São Tomé and Príncipe. It lies 3.7 km westnorthwest the north coast of the island of Príncipe. It is 190 meters long and up to 60 meters wide in its northern part, and four meters high. Since 2012, the islet forms a part of the Island of Príncipe Biosphere Reserve.

References

Uninhabited islands of São Tomé and Príncipe
Príncipe